The Regionalliga Süd was the fourth tier of the German football league system from 2008 to 2012. Until the introduction of the 3. Liga in 2008, it was the third tier. It was the highest regional league for the southern part of Germany. It covered the states of Bavaria, Hesse and Baden-Württemberg and was one of three leagues at this level, together with the Regionalliga Nord and the Regionalliga West.

The league was disbanded at the end of the 2011–12 season, with the Bavarian clubs joining the new Regionalliga Bayern while the others joined the clubs from the southwest of Germany to form the new Regionalliga Südwest.

From 1963 to 1974, a Regionalliga Süd existed as the second tier of the German football league system, but this league is not directly related to the current one.

Overview

The Regionalliga Süd was introduced in 1994 along with three other Regionalligas, those being:
Regionalliga Nord
Regionalliga Nordost
Regionalliga West/Südwest

The reason for its introduction was to create a highest regional league for the south of Germany and to allow its champions, and some years the runners-up too, to be directly promoted to the 2. Bundesliga. Previous to the introduction of the four Regionalligas, below the second division were ten Oberligas. Those ten Oberliga champions had to go through a promotion play-off rather than being directly promoted.

The Regionalliga Süd originally was made up from clubs from the three southern states of Bavaria, Hesse and Baden-Württemberg. In 2000, with the reduction of the number of Regionalligas to two, the league also covered the states of Rhineland-Palatinate, Saarland and Thuringia. It also incorporated one club from Northrhine-Westphalia, the Sportfreunde Siegen.

From 2008, with re-expansion to three Regionalligas, the league again only contained clubs from the three original states. However, in 2010–11, the Wormatia Worms, a club from Rhineland-Palatinate, competed in the league.

League history

Foundation of the Regionalliga Süd 
The Regionalliga Süd was formed in 1994 with 18 clubs, originally with six from each of the three Oberligas. However, Baden-Württemberg lost one spot due to the Stuttgarter Kickers being relegated from the 2. Bundesliga.

The founding members were:

From 2. Bundesliga:
Stuttgarter Kickers (Baden-Württemberg)

From the Oberliga Bayern:
FC Augsburg
SpVgg Unterhaching
SpVgg Fürth
TSV Vestenbergsgreuth
FC Bayern Munich II
SV Lohhof

From the Oberliga Baden-Württemberg:
SSV Ulm 1846
SpVgg Ludwigsburg
TSF Ditzingen
SSV Reutlingen
VfR Mannheim

From the Oberliga Hessen:
Hessen Kassel
Kickers Offenbach
Rot-Weiß Frankfurt
SG Egelsbach
SV Wehen
SV Darmstadt 98

The "new" Regionalliga Süd was actually a reformation of the "old" Regionalliga Süd which operated from 1963 to 1974 in the same region but then as the second tier of German football. Unlike the "old" Regionalliga, the new one allowed reserve teams to compete in it.

Its first season saw the SpVgg Unterhaching winning the league and being promoted to the 2. Bundesliga while three out of the four teams relegated came from Hessen.

Expansion of the league in 2000

After six seasons, in 2000, the number of Regionalligas was reduced from four to two. Only the Regionalligas Süd and Nord survived. The clubs of the other two were spread according to their geographical location.

To make room for these extra clubs without expanding past the 18 team number, the seven bottom placed teams were supposed to be relegated. However, FC Augsburg (8th) did not receive a license for the next season and Karlsruher SC II (12th) had to drop down because the first team was relegated to the Regionalliga and regulations forbid two teams from the same club to compete in the same league at this level.

The relegated clubs were:
FC Augsburg
Karlsruher SC II
FSV Frankfurt
TSF Ditzingen
SG Quelle Fürth
Borussia Fulda
SV Lohhof

In their stead, the following seven teams were admitted:

From the 2. Bundesliga:
Karlsruher SC
Kickers Offenbach

From the Regionalliga West/Südwest:
Eintracht Trier
SV Elversberg
Sportfreunde Siegen

From the Regionalliga Nordost:
FC Carl Zeiss Jena
Rot-Weiß Erfurt

The league reform in 2008

With the introduction of the 3. Liga in 2008 and of a third Regionalliga, the Regionalliga West, the league became the fourth tier of German football. The clubs from the regions which joined in 2000 left again and the Regionalliga Süd was once more only made up from clubs from Bavaria, Hesse and Baden-Württemberg.

The make up of the leagues was:
Winner and runners-up of the Regionalliga Süd will qualified for the 2. Bundesliga (unless they are reserve teams)
Clubs placed third to tenth went to the new 3. Liga (only the two best placed reserve teams were to be admitted)
Clubs placed eleventh to eighteens remained in the Regionalligas (only clubs from the three southern states went to the southern group)
The four best teams out of the Oberligas Baden-Württemberg, Hessen and Bayern were promoted to the Regionalliga Süd

When the 2007–08 season finished on 31 May 2008, the following teams had fulfilled the on-the-field qualification for the Regionalliga. However, financial qualification was also necessary.

Remaining in the Regionalliga Süd:
SSV Reutlingen
TSV 1860 Munich II
Hessen Kassel
Karlsruher SC II
SC Pfullendorf

From the Oberliga Bayern:
SpVgg Greuther Fürth II
1. FC Nürnberg II
TSV Grossbardorf
1. FC Eintracht Bamberg
SpVgg Unterhaching II

From the Oberliga Hessen:
SV Darmstadt 98
SV Wehen Wiesbaden II
Viktoria Aschaffenburg
Eintracht Frankfurt II

From the Oberliga Baden-Württemberg:
SSV Ulm 1846
SV Waldhof Mannheim
SC Freiburg II
1. FC Heidenheim

Sportfreunde Siegen were intended to be the 18th club in the Regionalliga Süd, but due to its insolvency, the club was demoted to the Oberliga Nordrhein-Westfalen or below for the 2008–09 season. 1. FC Eintracht Bamberg was admitted to the Regionalliga in their stead, as the fifth-placed team in the largest of the southern football associations. Due to the refusal of a licence to Bayernliga champion SpVgg Bayreuth, Bamberg was awarded a place in the Regionalliga. The available last place then went to the SpVgg Unterhaching II.

2008–2012
After a 2008–09 season with a large number of new clubs, the league returned to a normal promotion/relegation system, with the winner moving up to the 3. Liga and the three last-placed teams being relegated to the Oberliga, while the three southern Oberliga champions were promoted in turn. In 2008–09, two clubs from the 3. Liga were relegated to the league.  This would have increased the number of teams to 19. However, Waldhof Mannheim was transferred to the Regionalliga West for the next season. Hessen Kassel, who had hoped to join the Regionalliga Nord for 2009–10 had to remain in the south. Viktoria Aschaffenburg, which finished on a non-relegation rank, withdrew from the league, allowing Karlsruher SC II to remain in it.

In the 2009–10 season, 1. FC Eintracht Bamberg and SSV Reutlingen both declared insolvency, forcing them to be automatically relegated.

In October 2010, another reform of the Regionalligas was decided upon. The number of leagues were now to be expanded to five, with the Bavarian clubs to leave the Regionalliga Süd and form their own Regionalliga Bayern. In their stead, the south western clubs from Rhineland-Palatinate and Saarland would re-join the league. The new system is due to come into operation in the 2012–13 season. It was also decided to limit the number of reserve teams per Regionalliga to seven.

In the 2010–11 season, SpVgg Weiden declared insolvency due to more than Euro 1 million in debts. Unable to raise enough funds to continue competing in the league, Weiden declared on 30 November 2010 that it would withdraw its Regionalliga team and thereby automatically be relegated. All games for the club in the 2010–11 season were declared void. The SSV Ulm 1846 suffered a similar fate, but was able to complete its fixtures as friendlies. Nevertheless, the club was relegated and its record expunged.

At the end of the season, the league became defunct with the Bavarian clubs joining the new Regionalliga Bayern while the remainder of the league members joined the new Regionalliga Südwest. The exceptions were the Stuttgarter Kickers, which were promoted to the 3. Liga, the FC Bayern Alzenau which, despite being from Bavaria, opted to play in the Regionalliga Süd/Südwest and Karlsruher SC II which was ineligible for the Regionalliga after the first team of the club was relegated to the 3. Liga. No other team was relegated.

Winners and runners-up of the Regionalliga Süd
The winners and runners-up of the league are:

Source:
In 1997, the runners-up SpVgg Greuther Fürth was also promoted.
In 1999, the runners-up Kickers Offenbach was also promoted.
From 2001 to 2008, the runners-up was always promoted. In 2001 however, FC Schweinfurt 05 (3rd) won promotion as VfB Stuttgart II was ineligible.
In 2004, 1. FC Saarbrücken (3rd) won promotion as FC Bayern Munich II was ineligible.

League statistics
The top goal scorers and spectator statistics for the league are:

Placings in the Regionalliga Süd
The following clubs have played in the league and achieved the following final positions:

Source:

Key

Notes 
 Clubs from outside the three southern states of Bavaria, Hesse and Baden-Württemberg are marked with an *.
 1 FC Augsburg was refused a license in 2000 and relegated to the Oberliga
 2 Karlsruher SC II was relegated to the Oberliga in 2000 since the club's first team was relegated to the Regionalliga.
 3 SpVgg Bayreuth was refused a licence in 2006 and relegated to the Oberliga.
 4 VfR Mannheim withdrew from the league in 2002.
 5 TSV Vestenbergsgreuth merged with SpVgg Fürth in 1996 to form SpVgg Greuther Fürth.
 6 Viktoria Aschaffenburg withdrew from the league in 2009.
 7 SSV Reutlingen declared insolvency in 2010 and was relegated.

References

Sources
 Deutschlands Fußball in Zahlen,  An annual publication with tables and results from the Bundesliga to Verbandsliga/Landesliga, publisher: DSFS
 Kicker Almanach,  The yearbook on German football from Bundesliga to Oberliga, since 1937, published by the Kicker Sports Magazine
 Süddeutschlands Fussballgeschichte in Tabellenform 1897–1988  History of Southern German football in tables, publisher & author: Ludolf Hyll
 Die Deutsche Liga-Chronik 1945–2005  History of German football from 1945 to 2005 in tables, publisher: DSFS, published: 2006

External links 
 Official DFB web site on Regionalliga football
 Football results and tables from Germany

Sud
Football competitions in Saarland
Football competitions in Rhineland-Palatinate
Football competitions in Baden-Württemberg
4
Football competitions in Hesse
Football competitions in Thuringia
1994 establishments in Germany
2012 disestablishments in Germany
Defunct association football leagues in Germany
Ger
Sports leagues established in 1994
Sports leagues disestablished in 2012